SS Sutlej was a 3,549 ton steamship built for the Nourse Line in about 1907 by Charles Connell & Company Limited, Glasgow.  She had single screw, triple expansion,  engines.

Like other Nourse Line ships, she was primarily used for the transportation of Indian indentured labourers to the colonies. Details of some of these voyages are as follows:

Sutlej was the last ship to transport Indian indentured labourers to Fiji. In 1929, she was sold to Sun Shipping Company, London renamed Cape St. Francis.

See also 
 Indian Indenture Ships to Fiji
 Indian indenture system

External links 
 Updated List of Ships that transported E..., By Richard B.Shiva Ram August 27, 2000, Genealogy.com
 Nourse Line
 Indian Immigrant Ship List
 The Compass

History of Suriname
History of Guyana
Indian indentureship in Trinidad and Tobago
Indian indenture ships to Fiji
Victorian-era passenger ships of the United Kingdom